Richard "Dixie" Hale (29 May 1935 – 12 May 2021) was an Irish footballer and manager who played for several clubs in both the League of Ireland and the English League, most notably Waterford, Shamrock Rovers, Swansea Town and Watford. As an international, he also played for the League of Ireland XI.

Career

Born in Waterford City, Hale started his footballing career when he joined his three brothers, Alfie, George, and Harry, at St Joseph's where he had a successful underage career, winning two cup finals on the same day at under-15 and senior level in 1950. Hale had just turned 16 when he joined Waterford F.C., and a year later he became the first professional player signed by Shamrock Rovers. His time in Dublin didn't last long and he moved back to play in Waterford, before leaving for Swansea Town in September 1959. He played there for two years before subsequently joining Barrow and Workington. Hale signed for Watford in 1968 and won the Third Division title that season. After retiring professionally at 35,  he went into management in the Welsh League.

Death
Hale died in Swansea on 12 May 2021.

Honours
Watford
Football League Third Division: 1968–69

References

1935 births
2021 deaths
Republic of Ireland association footballers
Association footballers from County Waterford
Association football midfielders
English Football League players
League of Ireland players
Waterford F.C. players
Shamrock Rovers F.C. players
Watford F.C. players
League of Ireland XI players
Republic of Ireland expatriate association footballers
Expatriate footballers in England